This is list of mountain passes of India.

References

I
 
M